is a Japanese actor who is represented by the talent agency Cube. He graduated from Ichikawa High School.

Biography
Kyo was born with Korean nationality in Japan and later became a naturalized Japanese. In 1998, he won the photogenic award and P-mail grand prix at the 11th Junon Super Boy Contest. His application was submitted by his sister. Kyo signed with the talent agency, Cube, and made his stage debut as a member of Studio Life, a troupe Cube managed. In 2002, Kyo later debuted in Ninpuu Sentai Hurricaneger as Isshuu Kasumi / Kuwaga Raiger. After that he appeared in television dramas, films, and stage shows.

Kyo appeared in dramas and films such as Wakaba, Trick, Nana2, and Hanazakari no Kimitachi e.

He, with Kohei Yamamoto, Yujiro Shirakawa, Ryuichiro Nishioka, and Yūsuke Tomoi, became a member of the clothes brand Anunnaki.

Filmography

TV series

Films

References

External links
 
  

Japanese male film actors
Japanese male television actors
1979 births
Living people
People from Himeji, Hyōgo
Actors from Hyōgo Prefecture
21st-century Japanese male actors